Mariae may refer to :

Biology
The specific name mariae is fairly often used:
Mollusca, gastropoda:
Calliostoma mariae a marine gastropod mollusc
Columbarium mariae a species of pagoda shell, a deepwater sea snail
Cypraea mariae a small species of cowry, a marine gastropod mollusk
Helicella mariae a species of land snail in the family Hygromiidae 
Herpetopoma mariae a species of marine gastropod mollusc in the family Trochidae
Muricopsis espinosus mariae a subspecies of medium-sized sea snail
Other mollusca:
Notoplax mariae a species of chiton in the family Acanthochitonidae.
Frogs:
Hyperolius mariae a species of frog in the family Hyperoliidae
Centrolene mariae a species of frog in the family Centrolenidae
Plants:
Lithops vallis-mariae a species of plant in the family Aizoaceae 
Livistona mariae a species of flowering plant in the family Arecaceae
Others:
Seimatosporium mariae a plant pathogen.

Music
Mariae is a soul-blues band from Manila, Philippines.

Religion
Deiparae Virginis Mariae is an encyclical of Pope Pius XII to all Catholic bishops on the possibility of defining the Assumption of the Blessed Virgin Mary as a dogma of faith.
The Congregatio Immaculati Cordis Mariae is a Belgian Roman Catholic missionary congregation established in 1862.
Rosarium Virginis Mariae is the title of an Apostolic Letter by Pope John Paul II, issued on October 16, 2002. 
Servi Jesu et Mariae are a Roman Catholic Congregation for priests, which was founded in 1988 by Father Andreas Hönisch.